Golf's Best: St. Andrews - The Home of Golf is a 1986 video game published by 1 Step Software, Inc.

Gameplay
Golf's Best is a game in which the Pinehurst course is included.

Reception
James Delson for Family Computing stated "Not for arcade aficionados who want lots of action, this is a thinking game for sports enthusiasts and serious gamers age 10 and over."

Rick Teverbaugh reviewed the game for Computer Gaming World, and stated that "Golf's Best comes highly recommended from this duffer."

Stephen Banker for Compute! described the game as "Among the cleverest" in arcade-style games based on contests of skill.

References

1986 video games
Apple II games
Commodore 64 games
DOS games
Golf video games
St Andrews
Video games developed in the United States
Video games set in Scotland